Akbar Sadeghi is an Iranian footballer, who currently plays for Nassaji Mazandaran  in Persian Gulf Pro League. He usually plays as a midfielder.

Club career
Sadeghi joined Saba Qom in 2011 after spending the previous year at Sanati Kaveh.

 Assist Goals

References

External links
 Akbar Sadeghi at Persian League
 

Living people
Sanati Kaveh players
Aluminium Hormozgan F.C. players
Saba players
Shahr Khodro F.C. players
Zob Ahan Esfahan F.C. players
Iranian footballers
1985 births
Association football midfielders
Iran international footballers
Nassaji Mazandaran players